Heidi Janků (born 23 November 1962) is a Czech singer and actress. She released her first single, "Já jsem já" in 1982.

Discography

Studio albums
1986: Heidi
1987: Úplně všechno
1987: Runnin' on
1990: Cesta kolem těla
1992: Heidi
1996: Ave Maria
2000: Zpověď
2002: Zlatej důl jsem přece já
2004: Buď a nebo
2006: Já jsem pořád já

References

External links
 (in Czech)

1962 births
Living people
Musicians from Ostrava
20th-century Czech women singers
Czech voice actresses
21st-century Czech women singers
Czechoslovak women singers